The ENPI CBC Italy-Tunisia Programme is a European cooperation programme. It is part of the European Strategy 2007-2013 for Cross-border cooperation of the European Neighbourhood Policy (ENP), implemented in the context of the enlargement of the European Union.

Eligible Area
The Programme eligible areas are the following:

Areas in Sicily: The regional Provinces of Agrigento, Caltanissetta, Ragusa, Siracusa, Trapani
Areas in Tunisia: The governorates of Ariana, Beja, Ben Arous, Bizerte, Nabeul, Jendouba, Manouba, Tunis

Aim and purpose of the Programme
The Programme aims to achieving the following General Objective:
"Promoting the economic, social, institutional and cultural integration between the Sicilian and Tunisian regions through a joint sustainable development process in the context of the cross border cooperation.”

Priorities and Measures
The Programme Priorities for action are:

Priority 1 - Development and regional integration supporting the development and integration of the key economic sectors, promoting the flow of goods, the research and innovation;

Priority 2. Promoting sustainable development through an efficient management of resources in agriculture and fishery, the protection and enhancement of natural and cultural heritage and the development of renewable energy sources;

Priority 3. Enhancing cultural and scientific cooperation and support to networking;

Priority 4. Securing a high quality level of management, surveillance and control of the Programme through activities of technical assistance.

Funding
The total budget of the ENPI CBC Italy-Tunisia Programmes 25.191 million EUR for the 2007–2013 period:

13.603 million EUR for Priority 1
4.543 million EUR for Priority 2
4.534 million EUR for Priority 3

References

External links
 CBC Italy-Tunisia Programme Official Website
 Regione Siciliana
 Regione Siciliana – Information Website
 Ministère de la Planification et de la Coopération Internationale
 Délégation de l'Union européenne en Tunisie
 European Neighbourhood Policy
 ENPI Cross-Border

Foreign relations of the European Union
Italy–Tunisia relations